Karin is a historic coastal settlement located in the Sahil region of Somaliland.

History 

Karin was historically part of a chain of coastal Habr Je'lo settlements and ports – stretching from near Siyara in the west to Heis (Xiis) in the east – that were important to trade and communication with the Somali interior. While the settlement were not as significant as the more established ports of Berbera, Zeila and Bulhar (respectively), Karin (Kurrum) was a major market for livestock and frankincense procured from the interior, and was a favorite for livestock traders due to the close proximity of the port to Aden. Karin was also described as the most important of all Habr Je'lo ports, and was closer to Aden than Berbera.

Habr Je’lo traders acted as middlemen to Dhulbahante livestock herders in the interior by purchasing and/or bartering their stock for export to the Aden market:

Burning of Karin 
In 1831, the Yeesif, a subclan of the Mohamed Abokor, was in control of the historic trading port town of Karin. A multitude of other tribes were also present in the town to trade. According to Somali history, Karin was a gated town, with the Yeesif subclan controlling who could enter and leave the town, investing heavily in protecting the town due to its importance. 

In 1831 a girl of the Rer Dod subclan married a young Yeesif warrior, however, a man of the Adan Madoba, another subclan of the Mohamed Abokor, also intended to marry her and couldn’t accept the fact that the marriage took place. The Adan Madoba man went to his tribesmen and explained the situation to them, threatening to sever his testicles if the clan did not intervene. The Adan Madoba tribesmen then assassinated the Yeesif groom, which led to a 40 year long conflict where allegedly the grandson of the Rer Dod girl participated in the fighting. The conflict is described by British explorer Richard Burton in 1855, who stated:

With the conflict still raging, in 1871 the Adan Madoba, on the verge of turning the Yeesif to extinct, and after losing 19 men to a Yeesif counterattack, decided one last attack on the Yeesif would finally win them this long war and allow them to conquer Karin. The Adan Madoba assembled hundreds of horsemen led by Mohamed Ismail (nicknamed Qaaje Guray) for one final offensive on the Yeesif still in Karin. Days before the attack Qaaje Gurey presented his tribesmen three options; to either attack Karin, a majority Yeesif town but also inhabited by the Nuh (a subclan of the Mohamed Abokor) and kill anyone in Karin, surround Karin first and call on all the non-Yeesif tribes to evacuate the town immediately and attack the town once evacuation has been completed, or to burn the town in its entirety. The Adan Madoba opted for the second option. 

The Adan Madona approached Karin and ordered the Nuh to evacuate Karin, notifying them of their intent to attack the Yeesif. However, the Nuh tribesmen refused and aided their Yeesif brothers, as according to folklore the ancestors of the Nuh and Yeesif tribes shared the same mother. The Adan Madoba proceeded to attack Karin and successfully burned the town down. However, they failed to defeat the combined Yeesif-Nuh forces and soon the Adan Madoba were forced to retreat, effectively ending the Yeesif-Adan Madoba conflict.

Dirir Warsame, a Yeesif tribal soldier came upon a man of the Adan Madoba named Halil who was captured by Yeesif tribesmen. Dirir recited this poem before killing him;

Demographics 
The town is predominantly inhabited by members of the Mohamed Abokor subdivision of the Habr Je'lo Isaaq.

See also
Administrative divisions of Somaliland
Regions of Somaliland
Districts of Somaliland

References 

Populated places in Sahil, Somaliland